San Antonio is a village in the Canelones Department of southern Uruguay. 

San Antonio is also the name of the municipality to which the town belongs.

Location

History
Its status was elevated to "Pueblo" (village) by Decree of 14 November 1875.

Population
In 2011 San Antonio had a population of 1,489. The Intendencia de Canelones has estimated a population of 3,552 for the municipality.

 
Source: Instituto Nacional de Estadística de Uruguay

Places of worship
 St. Anthony of Padua Parish Church (Roman Catholic)

References

External links

INE map of San Antonio

Populated places in the Canelones Department